Stephen Neil Kasper (born September 28, 1961) is a Canadian former professional ice hockey forward who played thirteen seasons in the National Hockey League (NHL) with the Boston Bruins, Los Angeles Kings, Philadelphia Flyers and Tampa Bay Lightning. Kasper won the Frank J. Selke Trophy as top defensive forward during his second season in the NHL. He moved into coaching following his playing career, serving as the Bruins' head coach during the 1995–96 and 1996–97 seasons.

Playing career
Kasper began his hockey career with the Verdun Eperviers and the Sorel Black Hawks in the Quebec Major Junior Hockey League. He topped the 100 point mark twice and was chosen 81st overall by the Boston Bruins in the 1980 NHL Entry Draft. Kasper earned a spot on the roster, playing a total of 76 games and scoring 51 points. He emerged as one of the best checking centres of the game and was subsequently awarded the Frank J. Selke Trophy in 1981–82. Kasper helped the Bruins reach the semi-finals in 1982–83. In 1987–88, Kasper and the Bruins made it to the Stanley Cup Finals, where they were defeated by the Edmonton Oilers, 4-0 with one tie. Kasper was traded to the Los Angeles Kings for Bobby Carpenter in 1988–89. Kasper enjoyed some success with the Kings playing with Wayne Gretzky and Bernie Nicholls before being traded to the Philadelphia Flyers in 1991–92. He played two seasons in Philadelphia before being traded again to the Tampa Bay Lightning. Kasper played in 47 games with the Bolts before retiring.

Coaching career
Kasper returned to Boston as an assistant coach to Brian Sutter. On July 22, 1994, he was named the head coach of the Providence Bruins of the American Hockey League. He led the Bruins to the second round of the playoffs before being eliminated from contention. Kasper then again returned to Boston in 1995–96 to replace Sutter as head coach. He led the Bruins to a 91-point season. After a first round exit to the Florida Panthers and 26 wins in the 1996-97 season, Kasper was fired and replaced by Pat Burns. This marked the first time in 28 years the Bruins had missed the playoffs. On May 3, 2007, Kasper became the new head coach of the Maritime Junior A Hockey League (CJAHL) team, the Yarmouth Mariners.
Kasper was fired as director of pro scouting for the Toronto Maple Leafs on Sunday, April 12, 2015, the day after the team's last game of the season.

Awards and achievements
 Frank J. Selke Trophy winner in 1982.

Career statistics

Coaching record

References

External links
 

1961 births
Living people
Anglophone Quebec people
Boston Bruins coaches
Boston Bruins draft picks
Boston Bruins players
Canadian ice hockey coaches
Canadian ice hockey centres
Frank Selke Trophy winners
Ice hockey people from Quebec
Los Angeles Kings players
People from Saint-Lambert, Quebec
Philadelphia Flyers players
Tampa Bay Lightning players
Toronto Maple Leafs scouts